KPIT Technologies Limited (formerly KPIT Cummins Infosystems Ltd) is an Indian multinational corporation which provides embedded software and product engineering services to automotive companies. Popularly known as KPIT, the company is headquartered in Pune and has development centers in Europe, USA, Japan, and China, apart from India.

KPIT has filed 58 patents, published some research papers, and has won several awards for innovation.

History 
KPIT was co-founded in 1990 by Ravi Pandit and Kishor Patil, as KPIT Infosystems. Both of them are chartered accountants by profession, and they were partners in an accountancy firm, Kirtane & Pandit Chartered Accountants (KPCA). The company made its initial public offer (IPO) in 1999, which was 50 times oversubscribed.

In 2002, Cummins Infotech, the IT department of Cummins merged with KPIT, and the name of the company became KPIT Cummins Infosystems Ltd.

KPIT Cummins Infosystems changed its name to "KPIT Technologies Limited" in September 2013. This was in line with Cummins' decision to reduce its shareholding in KPIT, to focus on its core business of engine and generator manufacturing.

In January 2018, Birlasoft, an IT company, and KPIT announced that they will merge and immediately split into two new companies. In April 2018, this deal was approved by the Competition Commission of India. After the corporate spin-off of the new company, an IT company and an automotive company would be formed. The IT company would work under the name of Birlasoft, and the automotive company will work under the name of KPIT Technologies. According to the original plan, the shareholders of Birlasoft would receive 22 shares of the combined company for every 9 shares they hold in Birlasoft, and the shareholders of KPIT Technologies would receive 1 share of the new company working under the name of KPIT Technologies, for every share they hold in KPIT Technologies. In an interview, Ravi Pandit, co-founder, chairman, and CEO of KPIT Technologies, commented upon this deal, "Segregating business IT and automotive tech businesses will provide sharper focus on each business." On 22 April 2019, KPIT Technologies Limited got listed on BSE and NSE. The transaction resulted in two publicly traded specialized technology companies – KPIT Technologies - focused on automotive engineering and mobility solutions; and Birlasoft – focused on IT services.

On 6 June 2019, KPIT launched its new corporate logo.

Products and services
KPIT provides software solution in form of product & services to automotive companies and its business is segregated into six domains, namely, Autonomous Driving, Connected Vehicles, Electric & Conventional Powertrain, Vehicle Diagnostics, AUTOSAR and Mechatronics. KPIT's clients include BMW, Cummins, Paccar, Lafarge, GM, DICV etc.; It has also created software solutions such as Revolo, which is the first ARAI-certified JNNURM II compliant On-Bus intelligent transport system.

References

International information technology consulting firms
Software companies of India
Engineering companies of India
Multinational companies headquartered in India
Indian companies established in 1990
Technology companies established in 1990
Companies based in Pune
1990 establishments in Maharashtra
Companies listed on the National Stock Exchange of India
Companies listed on the Bombay Stock Exchange